Rock’n Roll  is a limited edition Dread Zeppelin album from 1991 available only in Japan (or import). The album contains both studio recordings and live performances. The short running time of the album suggests that it was at a promotional tool for the band in Japan.

The leaflet contains lyrics for all songs (in English), a picture of the seven band members in what looks like a Japanese city street, followed by two pages of Japanese text and finally the track listing in Japanese and English.

Track listing
"Rock'N Roll" (Bonham, Page, Plant, Jones) – 4:40 
"Communication Breakdown" (Page, Jones, Bonham) – 2:38 
"Stir It Up" (Edit) (Bob Marley) – 3:52 
"Immigrant Song" (Live) (Page, Plant) – 8:21
"Stairway To Heaven" (Live) (J.Page, R. Plant) – 11:56

The Players
 Jah Paul Jo - Guitar, Keyboard and Vocals
 Tortelvis – Lead singer
 Ed Zeppelin – percussion, vocals and keys.
 Carl Jah – Guitars, vocals
 Butt Mon - Bass guitar
 Charlie Haj - is the man that hands Tortelvis his water and towel on stage.

Production
The leaflet is sparse, without some basic information such as band members or production credits.

According to the track listing, tracks 1—3 were recorded at the Chapel, Encino, California, in February/May 1991. Lead vocals on track 3 were by Jah Paul Jo and background vocals by The Peace And Love Army. Tracks 4 and 5 were recorded live from the long lost New Year's Eve 1956 tapes, in Las Vegas, Nevada. All tracks were produced by Jah Paul Jo and Rasta Li-Mon for Birdcage Productions. The album was manufactured and distributed by Victor Musical Industries in Tokyo.

Notes 

Dread Zeppelin albums
1991 albums
I.R.S. Records albums